86 (eighty-six) is the natural number following 85 and preceding 87.

In mathematics
86 is:

 nontotient and a noncototient.
 the 25th distinct semiprime and the 13th of the form (2×q).
 an Erdős–Woods number, since it is possible to find sequences of 86 consecutive integers such that each inner member shares a factor with either the first or the last member.
 a happy number and a self number in base 10.

It appears in the Padovan sequence, preceded by the terms 37, 49, 65 (it is the sum of the first two of these).

It is conjectured that 86 is the largest n for which the decimal expansion of 2n contains no 0.

86 = (8 × 6 = 48) + (4 × 8 = 32) + (3 × 2 = 6). That is, 86 is equal to the sum of the numbers formed in calculating its multiplicative persistence.

In science
 86 is the atomic number of radon.
 There are 86 metals on the modern periodic table.

In other fields
In American English, and particularly in the food service industry, 86 has become a slang term referring to an item being out of stock or discontinued, and by extension to a person no longer welcome on the premises.
The number of the French department Vienne. This number is also reflected in the department's postal code and in the name of a local basketball club, Poitiers Basket 86.
+86 is the code for international direct dial phone calls to China.
An art gallery in Ventura, California, displaying art pieces from such artists Billy Childish, Stacy Lande and Derek Hess, most of which include the number *86 hidden or overtly shown in the art, and some of which fall under the genre of lowbrow.
86 is the device number for a lockout relay function in electrical engineering electrical circuit protection schemes.
86 is often used in Japan as the nickname for the Toyota AE86.
86 is the name of a series of Japanese science fiction light novels written by Asato Asato, later adapted as a manga and an anime.

See also
List of highways numbered 86

Notes

Integers